J'ai l'honneur d'être is the nineteenth album by experimental French singer Brigitte Fontaine, released in 2013 on the Universal Music Group label. Areski Belkacem composed and arranged all songs except La Pythonisse and Les Crocs, which were composed and arranged by Jean-Claude Vannier.

Track listing

Brigitte Fontaine albums
2013 albums